This is a list of awards and nominations received by American film director, screenwriter, producer, and novelist Peter Farrelly. In 2018 he co-wrote and directed the comedy-drama Green Book, which won the Audience Award at the Toronto Film Festival in 2018. He won the Golden Globe Award for Best Screenplay and the Academy Awards for Best Picture and Best Original Screenplay.

Major associations

Academy Awards

British Academy Film Awards

Golden Globe Awards

Other awards and nominations

Austin Film Festival

Boston Film Festival

Critics' Choice Movie Awards

Daytime Emmy Award

Denver Film Festival

Detroit Film Critics Society

Directors Guild of America Award

Florida Film Critics Circle

Golden Raspberry Awards

Hollywood Film Awards

Philadelphia Film Festival

Producers Guild of America Awards

San Diego Film Critics Society

Satellite Awards

Sports Emmy Awards

St. Louis International Film Festival

Toronto International Film Festival

Washington D.C. Area Film Critics Association

Writers Guild of America Awards

References

External links
 

Farrelly, Peter